JellyCar (originally known as JelloCar) is the first in a series of 2D driving and side scrolling platform games developed by Tim FitzRandolph and released under the pseudonym Walaber. Initially released independently through Xbox Live Indie Games and later ported to devices using Apple's iOS operating system, JellyCar requires players to drive a car across a two-dimensional landscape while maintaining balance by means of (in the case of platforms on which it is supported) accelerometers. The game features soft body physics that give it its distinctive gameplay and style. JellyCar's success led FitzRandolph's employer at the time, Disney Interactive Studios, to pick up the series and release two sequels for multiple platforms. As of December 8th 2022, FitzRandolph, now an independent developer, has released a new sequel, JellyCar Worlds, with permission from Disney.

Gameplay

In JellyCar, players drive a small car across various platforms and through obstacles in order to reach the goal. The player's car is made out of a gelatinous substance (hence the name), giving it both flexibility and durability. As the player advances through the level, a meter begins to fill; when it fills to capacity, the player can make the car expand and grow into a monster truck, allowing it to traverse larger obstacles for a short period of time.

Development
JellyCar designer Tim FitzRandolph began developing the game in his spare time at home while working with Disney Interactive Studios. His first version of the game was created using Microsoft's XNA development tools and released through the Indie Games community on Xbox Live for the Xbox 360 gaming console in February 2008. In a November 2011 interview, FitzRandolph explained his intentions with JellyCar:

After Apple unveiled the App Store, FitzRandolph purchased an iPod Touch with the intent of porting the game to the device. The iOS version was first released in October 2008.

Reception of JellyCar
JellyCar has received generally positive reviews. Zach Okkema, reviewing the iOS version for Macworld.com, said the game was "a fun way to pass the time—particularly for kids". Jeff Noble of appadvice.com said that JellyCar was "charming, fun, simple and crazily addictive".

JellyCar 2

Soon after the release of the original JellyCar on the Apple App Store, FitzRandolph approached Disney Mobile, the mobile gaming division of Disney Interactive Studios, about producing a sequel to the game. Disney Mobile, in need of a new gaming property, agreed to help develop and publish the game. The sequel was codeveloped by Disney Mobile Games Studios that is based in Beijing. New features offered in the sequel included additional abilities for the car, such as balloons and adhesive tires, and the addition of a level editor. FitzRandolph would later describe the experience as "exciting" and "overwhelming":

JellyCar 2 was first released on iOS devices in November 2009, but was later ported to other devices. An iPad-enhanced version launched day-and-date with the iPad itself in April 2010. That November, JellyCar 2 was released as a PlayStation Mini on Sony's PlayStation Portable system. In 2011, JellyCar 2 was ported to Nintendo's two major download services, WiiWare (in January) and DSiWare (in March).

Reception of JellyCar 2
The reviews of JellyCar 2 have been generally positive. Lisa Cowdell of Gamezebo said that the iOS version was "a tasty title you probably want to give a spin", but that the controls could sometimes be "downright frustrating". PSPMinis.com said that the PlayStation Portable version was "a well conceived game that is simple but 'non-frustratingly' challenging".

The reviews for the two Nintendo versions were more mixed. In its review of the DSiWare version, Nintendo Life's Jacob Crites said that JellyCar 2 was "DSiWare done right: fun, pick-up-and play-style gameplay with a variety of options and tons of replay value", but that "the DSiWare size limitations haven't been kind", noting that the level editor was removed to conserve space. As to the WiiWare version, Patrick Elliott, also writing for Nintendo Life, said the game was "a sweet little port that spreads it on thick". However, IGN's Audrey Drake said the WiiWare version was "a downgrade from its mobile predecessors thanks to wonky controls, barely upgraded graphics, and no online connectivity".

JellyCar 3

A second sequel to the original game, JellyCar 3 was released in February 2011 on the Apple App Store. As before, JellyCar 3 added more features to the game, such as video replays, car customization and secret goals. A limited rewind feature was also added, allowing players to back up on the current level and resume at a chosen point; a total of ten rewinds were available, with extra rewinds as in-app purchases. A March 2011 update added new car shapes, new customization options and the ability to race ghosts of other players.

Reception of JellyCar 3
Reviews of JellyCar 3 have been generally favorable, with a Metacritic rating of 84, based on seven reviews. Steve McCaskill of Pocket Gamer said the game was "an addictive combination of driving and physics-based platforming that manages to overcome one or two minor control issues". In the review for SlideToPlay.com, Chris Reed said that JellyCar 3 was "a bouncy, wildly creative romp" and that the March 2011 update "brings more value to an already great game".

Discontinuation, block and removal of JellyCar 2 & 3
Disney Interactive Studios retired both JellyCar 2 and JellyCar 3 along with many other applications in Spring 2014. They are no longer available for download.

JellyCar Worlds 

In June 2021, for the first time since 2010, Walaber announced on his Twitter page and website that a new installment in the series known as JellyCar Worlds was now in development. Progress is broadcast via Twitch. The game is slated to appear on as many platforms as possible. As of October 6, 2021, Walaber has let some people playtest for JellyCar Worlds, Walaber also posts videos relating to JellyCar Worlds on his TikTok and Twitter accounts, and makes devlogs on his YouTube channel. The game is now currently available on Nintendo Switch and Steam for $7.99 as well as Apple iOS. (Included with Apple Arcade)

References

External links
JellyCar for iPhone and iPod touch (App Store link)

2008 video games
Android (operating system) games
Disney Interactive franchises
DSiWare games 
IOS games
PlayStation Network games
PlayStation Portable games
WiiWare games
Video games developed in China
Video games developed in the United States
Xbox 360 Live Indie games
Racing video games
Platform games